Celje National Hall is a city hall in Celje, a town in central-eastern Slovenia. It was built between 1895 and 1896 and today hosts the seat of a township. Such national halls were typical of the Slovene Lands of the period.

References

External links

Slovene national halls
National Hall
Government buildings completed in 1896
Jan Vladimír Hráský buildings
Renaissance Revival architecture in Slovenia